On 22 April 2022, an explosion in southern Nigeria killed 110 people. It happened at an illegal oil refinery on the boundary of Imo State and Rivers State.

References

2022 disasters in Nigeria
April 2022 events in Nigeria
Explosions in 2022
Explosions in Nigeria
Factory fires